Harøya is a swampy island in Ålesund Municipality in Møre og Romsdal county, Norway. At , it is the largest island in the municipality. The island is located between the islands of Finnøya (to the northeast) and Fjørtofta (to the southwest).

Steinshamn, the municipal center, is located at the north end of the island where there is a causeway connecting it to the neighboring island of Finnøya. The village of Myklebost is located at the south end of the island, where there are ferry connections to Dryna (in Midsund) and Brattvåg and Fjørtofta (in Haram). Harøy Church is located in the center of the island, just north of the Lomstjønna Nature Reserve.

The new Nordøyvegen bridge and tunnel project will connect the island of Harøy to the mainland when it is completed.

See also
List of islands of Norway

References

Ålesund
Islands of Møre og Romsdal
Ramsar sites in Norway